Peter Parker is the secret identity of the Marvel Comics character Spider-Man.

Fictional characters 

 Other versions of the character, see List of incarnations of Spider-Man and Alternative versions of Spider-Man

Peter Parker, the grandson of Peter's Pocket Grandpa, a character in The Dandy

People 
Sir Peter Parker, 1st Baronet (1721–1811), British Admiral and Member of Parliament, friend and patron of Admiral Nelson
Sir Peter Parker, 2nd Baronet (1785–1814), English naval officer
Peter Parker (physician) (1804–1888), first Protestant medical missionary to China
Peter Parker (British businessman) (1924–2002), chairman of the British Railways Board, 1976–1983
Peter Parker (author) (born 1954), British biographer and journalist
Peter Parker (umpire) (born 1959), Australian cricket umpire

Pete Parker (1895–1991), Canadian radio announcer

Other uses 

 Peter Parker: Spider-Man, multiple comic book series 

Peter Parker House

See also 

 Spider-Man (disambiguation)